Boys High School is a historic and architecturally notable public school building in the Bedford–Stuyvesant neighborhood of Brooklyn, New York, United States. It is regarded as "one of Brooklyn's finest buildings".

Architecture
The Romanesque Revival building is richly decorated in terracotta somewhat in the style of Louis Sullivan. The building is admired for its round corner tower, dormers, and soaring campanile.

The building was erected in 1891 on the west side of Marcy Avenue between Putnam Avenue and Madison Street. It was designed by James W. Naughton, Superintendent of Buildings for the Board of Education of the City of Brooklyn. The building is regarded as Naughton's "finest work."

When Boys High was landmarked by the New York City Landmarks Preservation Commission in 1975, the commission called it "one of the finest Romanesque Revival style buildings in the city". It was listed on the National Register of Historic Places on February 25, 1982.

The building was the exterior filming location for the Knickerbocker Hospital in the television show The Knick.

School

In 1975, the same year the building was landmarked, Boys High merged with Girls' High School to become Boys and Girls High School. Boys and Girls High School immediately moved to a new building at Fulton Street and Utica Avenue.

The school was a college preparatory program with high academic standards. Congressman Emanuel Celler described Boys High in his autobiography, "I went to Boys' High School — naturally. I say "naturally" because Boys' High School then, as now, was the high school of scholarships. Boys of Brooklyn today will tell you, "It's a hard school." It was highly competitive..."

Another Boys High graduate remembered that "I went to Boys High School in Brooklyn, a great school. It was out of the classic tradition. I guess eighty percent of the student body had to take Latin — we didn't have to; we elected Latin, because we felt it was expected of us."

Notable alumni

Isaac Asimov (1920–1992), author
John Barsha (born Abraham Barshofsky; 1898–1976), American professional football player
Jules Bender (1914–1982), collegiate and professional basketball player
Himan Brown (1910–2010), producer of radio programs
Anatole Broyard (1920–1990), essayist, literary critic
Emanuel Celler (1888–1981), U.S. Representative for almost 50 years
Aaron Copland (1900–1990), classical composer, composition teacher, writer, and conductor
Howard Cosell (born Howard William Cohen, 1918–1995), television sports journalist
Mel Davis (born 1950), professional basketball player
Tommy Davis (born 1939), Major League Baseball player
I. A. L. Diamond (1920–1988), screenwriter
Martin Dobelle (1906–1986), orthopedic surgeon
Hal Draper (born Harold Dubinsky, 1914–1990), socialist activist and author
Ted Draper (1912–2006), historian and political writer
Lee Farr (1927–2017), actor
Leon Festinger (1919–1989), social psychologist
Mickey Fisher (1904/05–1963), basketball coach
Benjamin Graham (1894–1978), father of value investing
Al Goldstein (1936-2013), pornographer
Alfred Gottschalk (1930–2009), rabbi, leader in Reform Judaism movement
Jerome Anthony "Little Anthony" Gourdine (born 1941), lead singer of The Imperials
Sihugo "Si" Green (1933–1980), professional basketball player
Ezra E. H. Griffith (born 1942), psychiatrist
 Daniel Gutman (1901-1993), lawyer, state senator, state assemblyman, president justice of the municipal court, and law school dean.
Connie Hawkins (1942–2017), basketball Hall of Famer
 Will Herberg (1901–1977), political activist, philosopher, and author
 Gene Kelly (1918–1979), major league sportscaster
W. Langdon Kihn (1898–1957), portrait painter and illustrator
Morris Kline (1908–1992), professor of mathematics
Joseph Isaac Kramer (1924–2021), doctor
Benjamin Lax (1915–2015), physicist elected to National Academy of Sciences
William Levitt (1907–1994), developer of Levittown
Harry E. Lewis (1880–1948), lawyer, Brooklyn district attorney, New York Supreme Court Justice
Norman Lloyd (1914–2021), actor, director and producer
Norman Mailer (1923–2007), novelist, journalist, playwright, screenwriter, actor and film director
Mickey Marcus (1901–1948), US Army colonel who became Israel's first general
Ernest Martin (born 1932), theatre director and manager, actor
Abraham Maslow (1908–1970), professor of psychology
Will Maslow (1907–2007), lawyer and civil rights leader
Sean Michaels (born 1958), pornographic actor
Irving Mondschein (1924–2015), track and field champion
Jack Newfield (1938-2004), journalist
Man Ray (born Emmanuel Radnitzky, 1890–1976), artist
Max Roach (1924–2007), jazz percussionist, drummer, and composer
Meyer Schapiro (1904-1996), art historian
Aubrey Schenck (1908–1999), motion picture producer
 Allie Sherman (1923–2015), National Football League player and head coach
 Meier Steinbrink (1880–1967), lawyer and New York Supreme Court Justice
Fred Thompson (1933–2019) Hall of Fame Track and Field Coach
Lawrence Tierney (1919-2002), movie actor
Alexander S. Wiener (1907–1976), leader in fields of forensic medicine, serology, and immunogenetics
Lenny Wilkens (born 1937), NBA player and coach; Hall of Fame player and coach
Izzy Yablok (1907–1983), football player

Distinguished faculty
Mickey Fisher (1935-1962), Basketball coach made the Final Four every year from 1956 to 1962, coach of the Israeli Men's Olympic basketball team, Rome 1960.
James Sullivan (1873-1931), Principal (1907-1916), later Director of the YMCA for the American Expeditionary Forces, New York State Historian, and Director of Archives and History.

See also
List of New York City Landmarks

References

External links

 Images of Boys' High School

School buildings on the National Register of Historic Places in New York (state)
Romanesque Revival architecture in New York City
School buildings completed in 1891
New York City Designated Landmarks in Brooklyn
Bedford–Stuyvesant, Brooklyn
National Register of Historic Places in Brooklyn
Public high schools in Brooklyn